Zach Boren (born May 13, 1991) is an American football fullback who is currently a free agent.  He played college football at Ohio State University.  Boren originally played fullback, but was converted to linebacker midway through his senior season.

Early life
Boren was born in Pickerington, Ohio, and is Jewish. He attended Pickerington High School Central in Pickerington where he played football and baseball. As a baseball player, Boren was ranked number two in the state of Ohio, but chose to attend Ohio State to play football joining his brother Justin, who had recently transferred to the Buckeyes from arch-rival Michigan. As a football player, he achieved all-state accolades.

College career
In his first three seasons with the Ohio State Buckeyes, Boren started 27 games at fullback. He began the 2012 season there, but prior to Ohio State's game against the Indiana Hoosiers, Boren was moved to linebacker by the Ohio State coaching staff. He played linebacker for the remainder of the season, amassing 50 tackles, a sack, a forced fumble, and a fumble recovery.

The 2012 Ohio State squad, for whom Boren was a captain, would have been eligible for a Bowl Championship Series (BCS) Bowl, possibly even the national championship, but due to sanctions levied against them by the National Collegiate Athletic Association (NCAA) were not bowl-eligible.  He was named to the Jewish Sports Review 2012 College Football All-America Team.

Professional career

Houston Texans
On April 27, 2013, he signed with the Houston Texans as an undrafted free agent following the 2013 NFL Draft. He was released on August 27, 2013.

San Diego Chargers
On January 7, 2014, Boren signed a reserves/futures contract with the San Diego Chargers. The Chargers released Boren on August 25, 2014.

Tennessee Titans 
On August 7, 2015, Boren was signed by the Tennessee Titans and released injured fullback Connor Neighbors. Boren was later released by the Titans.

Personal life
Boren was raised in a sports-inclined family. His father Mike played linebacker at Michigan under Bo Schembechler in the 1980s, his mother Hope ran track at Michigan, and his older brother Justin, and younger brother Jacoby are both former Ohio State teammates. He attributes much of his success at Ohio State to the family atmosphere that coach Urban Meyer promotes.

See also
List of select Jewish football players

References

External links
 San Diego Chargers bio
 Houston Texans bio
 Ohio State Buckeyes bio

1991 births
Living people
American football fullbacks
American football linebackers
Ohio State Buckeyes football players
People from Pickerington, Ohio
Players of American football from Ohio
Jewish American sportspeople
21st-century American Jews